Hong Kong Legends was a United Kingdom DVD distribution company, based in Hertfordshire and operating from the UK and Australia between 1999 and 2007. Hong Kong Legends was initially part of Medusa Communications, who, along with Soulblade bought up the UK distribution rights for film titles previously owned by Eastern Heroes label.

Hong Kong Legends released 101 Hong Kong classic films, primarily martial arts films and other action films. In preparing the DVDs, they gained access to the vaults of Hong Kong studios such as Golden Harvest, selecting the films with the highest quality prints available. Hong Kong Legends added audio commentaries, most notably by Hong Kong cinema expert Bey Logan, conducted interviews with key actors, directors and other film crew, performed new translations for subtitles and cleaned up damage to the films.

Their catalogue of films included releases featuring Hong Kong stars such as Bruce Lee, Jackie Chan, Sammo Hung, Yuen Biao, Jet Li, Chow Yun-fat, Donnie Yen and Michelle Yeoh.

History

In 2004, Contender Entertainment Group (the UK branch of Entertainment One) took over Medusa Communications, including both Hong Kong Legends, and their sister brand, Premier Asia.

Brian White, who had been the Brand Manager and prime mover of the label, left Contender. He was also a close personal friend of Bey Logan. Logan decided it was time to leave the company and moved to the US, to begin working in a similar capacity for The Weinstein Company's East Asian DVD distribution company Dragon Dynasty.

Shortly thereafter, Harvey Weinstein brought White on board at Dragon Dynasty as Vice-President of Asian Brand Management and Post Production. With the loss of two of its biggest assets (Logan, for his popular commentaries; and White, who had been responsible for many of the exclusive extras), Hong Kong Legends had to cancel many of its planned releases. As no attempt was made to bring in replacement staff to perform audio commentaries, or to create bonus features, the release schedule dropped, ultimately spelling the demise of the company. Subsequent DVDs were released in so-called "Ultra Bit" versions, implying DVDs with improved bitrates or in otherwise "special editions". In fact, the releases were significantly more basic, the company having lost the rights for additional features other than trailers, and the bitrate was no higher than their previous releases.

The directors of Medusa went on to start a new company, Showbox Media Group.

Beginning in September 2005, in co-operation with magazine / partwork publisher De Agostini, a selection of the better known Hong Kong Legends titles were released along with a fortnightly magazine giving facts and backgrounds on the featured film. The titles released included Fist of Fury, Drunken Master, Once Upon a Time in China, The Killer. The series continued for 47 issues.

On 5 November 2007, Hong Kong Legends DVD label was discontinued, after the Cine Asia DVD label was formed.

On 18 March 2011, Cine Asia announced a revival of the Hong Kong Legends titles under the banner of Cine Asia Presents Hong Kong Legends.  The press release featured new artwork for The Big Boss, Fist of Fury, Game of Death, and Way of the Dragon.

Releases

Films

 2000 AD
 Armour of God
 The Avenging Fist
 Battle Creek Brawl
 Beast Cops
 A Better Tomorrow 2
 The Big Boss
 The Blacksheep Affair
 Body Weapon
 Bullet in the Head
 A Chinese Ghost Story
 A Chinese Ghost Story 2
 City Hunter
 City on Fire
 Crime Story
 Dragon Fist
 The Dragon from Russia
 Dragon Lord
 Dragons Forever
 Dreadnaught
 Drunken Master
 Duel to the Death
 Eastern Condors
 Encounters of the Spooky Kind
 The Fearless Hyena
 First Option
 Fist of Fury
 Flaming Brothers
 Full Contact
 Game of Death
 Game of Death II
 Hand of Death
 Hapkido
 Heart of the Dragon
 Heroes Shed No Tears
 Hitman
 Hong Kong 1941
 The Iceman Cometh
 In the Line of Duty
 Iron Fisted Monk
 Iron Monkey
 Island of Fire
 The Killer
 King of Beggars
 Knockabout
 Last Hurrah for Chivalry
 Legend of a Fighter
 Magnificent Bodyguards
 Magnificent Butcher
 Magnificent Warriors
 The Master
 Millionaire's Express
 Miracles
 Mr. Vampire
 Moon Warriors
 My Lucky Stars
 Naked Killer
 Naked Weapon
 New Dragon Gate Inn
 New Fist of Fury
 New Police Story
 Ninja in the Dragon's Den
 The Odd Couple
 Once a Thief
 Once Upon a Time in China
 Once Upon a Time in China II
 Once Upon a Time in China III
 Outlaw Brothers
 The Peacock King
 Police Assassins
 Police Story
 Police Story 2
 The Postman Fights Back
 The Prodigal Son
 Project A
 Project A Part II
 The Protector
 Purple Storm
 Red Wolf
 Riki-Oh: The Story of Ricky
 The Scorpion King
 Seoul Raiders
 Seven Swords
 Sex and Zen
 Shaolin Wooden Men aka Shaolin Chamber of Death
 She Shoots Straight
 Skinny Tiger, Fatty Dragon
 Snake & Crane Arts of Shaolin
 Snake in the Eagle's Shadow
 Spiritual Kung Fu
 The Swordsman
 Tai Chi Boxer
 Tiger on the Beat
 Twinkle, Twinkle Lucky Stars
 Warriors Two
 Way of the Dragon
 Wheels on Meals
 Wing Chun
 Winners and Sinners
 The Young Master
 Zu Warriors from the Magic Mountain

Documentaries
 An Introduction To Hong Kong Legends
 Bruce Lee, The Legend & Bruce Lee: The Man and the Legend
 Heromakers
 Jackie Chan: My Story / My Stunts

Box Sets

 Bruce Lee 30th Anniversary Commemorative
 The Donnie Yen Collection
 The Epic Action Collection
 The Fantasy Swordplay Collection
 The Jackie Chan Collection
 The Jackie Chan Project A Collection
 The Jet Li Collection
 The John Woo Collection
 Manga in Motion
 The Michelle Yeoh Collection
 The Police Story Double Disc Set
 Tsui Hark's Once Upon a Time in China Trilogy

Release information taken from various sources, including the now defunct official Hong Kong Legends website, IMDB
 and online stores such as HKFlix.

References

Film distributors of the United Kingdom
DVD companies of the United Kingdom
Mass media companies established in 1999
Companies disestablished in 2007
1999 establishments in the United Kingdom
2007 disestablishments in the United Kingdom